Tyaag may refer to:
 Tyaag (1977 film), a Bollywood film
 Tyaag (2004 film), a Bengali action drama film